Caulerpa constricta is a species of seaweed in the Caulerpaceae family.

It is found along the coast in a few small areas near Exmouth in the northern Gascoyne region, around the Abrolhos Islands in the Mid West and near Karratha in the Pilbara region of Western Australia.

References

constricta
Species described in 1998